Qızılkül is a rural locality (a derevnya) in Biektaw District, Tatarstan. The population was 24 as of 2010.

Geography 
Qızılkül is located 30 km west of Biektaw, district's administrative centre, and 50 km northeast of Qazan, republic's capital, by road.

History 
The village was established in 1930s.

Since its establishmant was a part of Arça District. After 1935 in Biektaw (1935–1963),  Piträç (1963–1965) and Biektaw districts.

References

External links 
 

Rural localities in Vysokogorsky District